:86 400 was an Australian neobank, owned by National Australia Bank (NAB). It was founded in 2019 by Robert Bell and Anthony Thomson

It was majority owned by payments company Cuscal prior to a takeover by NAB. It gained a licence to operate as an authorised deposit-taking institution in 2019.

In 2021, it was taken over by NAB for and merged into its UBank subsidiary.  This was approved by the Australian Competition & Consumer Commission, despite concerns about reducing competition. In October 2021, after the take-over by NAB, Robert Bell stepped down as CEO, to be replaced by Philippa Watson, CEO of UBank, who combined the roles of CEO of both NAB subsidiaries. The brand was retired in May 2022.

References

Banks established in 2019
Banks disestablished in 2022
Defunct banks of Australia
National Australia Bank
Neobanks
2019 establishments in Australia
2022 disestablishments in Australia